Ängelsberg is a village situated in Fagersta Municipality, Västmanland County, Sweden with 144 inhabitants in 2005. It is famous for the Engelsberg Ironworks and the oldest preserved oil refinery in the world, Engelsberg Refinery.

References 

Populated places in Västmanland County
Populated places in Fagersta Municipality